The Order of Oman (Wisam al-Oman) is the second highest order of Oman.

History 
The Order of Oman was instituted in 1970 by Sultan Qaboss in two divisions, civil and military. He added in 1982 a Special Class, "The Most Honourable Order of Oman" (Wisam Al-Sharif Al-Oman).

Divisions and classes 
The order exists in :
 A Special Class
 A civil division : First Class to Fifth Class
 A military division :  First Class to Fifth Class

Insignia 
The ribbon is :
 red with green borders, for the Special Class.
 red with green stripes, for the civil division, number and position depending on the class.
 blue with red stripes, for the military division, number and position depending on the class.

Recipients 
 Air Chief Marshal Farooq Feroze Khan, 1st Class (Military) - Joint Chief of Staff (Pakistan) - 1994-97
 Air Chief Marshal Tanvir Mahmood Ahmad, 1st Class (Military) - Chief of Air Staff (Pakistan) - 2006-09
 Hamad bin Khalifa Al Thani, special class
 Akihito, special class
 Azlan Shah of Perak, civil first class
 Hassan II of Morocco, special class
 Hassanal Bolkiah, civil first class
 Queen Elizabeth II, civil first class
 Isa bin Salman Al Khalifa, civil first class
 Jakaya Kikwete, civil first class
 Juan Carlos I of Spain, military first class
 Mohammad Reza Pahlavi, military first class
 Sabah Al-Ahmad Al-Jaber Al-Sabah, civil first class
 Asad bin Tariq Al-Said, military second class
 Mohammed Bin Salman, civil first class
Tamim Bin Hamad Al Thani, civil first class
 Philippe of Belgium, civil first class
 Hamad bin Isa Al Khalifa, civil first class

See also 
 Orders, decorations, and medals of Oman

Sources 
 World Medals Index, Special Class, civil division & military division
 Ribbon bars of Oman - page 1

Oman
Oman, Order of
Awards established in 1970
1970 establishments in Oman